Deere is an English family name. It is variant spelling of Dear. This name as two possible origins, the first is derived from the Middle English (1200-1500) personal name "Dere," from the Old English pre 7th century "Deora," meaning beloved and used as a byname. 
Also an Irish name derived from Dwyer.

Alan Christopher Deere (1917-1995), New Zealand air force personnel
Jack Deere, American pastor and theologian
Jason Deere (born 1968), American singer-songwriter
Jim Deere (born 1967), former American football player and coach
John Deere (inventor) (1804-1866), American blacksmith and inventor

Others 
Deere (automobile), American automobile manufacturer from 1906 to 1907
Chamberlain John Deere, brand of tractors of Australia
John Deere, brand name of Deere & Company

See also 
Dear (surname)
Deer (surname)